Alain Maxime Isiah (born 19 December 1977) is a Saint Kitts and Nevis athlete.

He was part of the first ever team to represent Saint Kitts and Nevis at the Olympic Games when he competed at the 1996 Summer Olympic Games in the 4 x 100 metres relay, the relay team finished four in their heat so didn't advance to the next round.

References

1977 births
Living people
Saint Kitts and Nevis male sprinters
Olympic athletes of Saint Kitts and Nevis
Athletes (track and field) at the 1996 Summer Olympics